Mala Gorica may refer to:

 Mala Gorica, Sisak-Moslavina County, a village near Petrinja
 Mala Gorica, Zagreb County, a village near Sveta Nedelja